The FIFI Wild Cup was an alternative FIFA World Cup, held from 29 May to 3 June 2006 in Germany, prior to the official FIFA World Cup which started one week later. It was run by the Federation of International Football Independents (FIFI). 

FIFI was a body composed of countries not recognized by FIFA and those whose logistics or political disputes prevented them from playing representative football. The Millerntor-Stadion in Hamburg hosted all the tournament matches. The tournament was sponsored by an online gambling consortium. 

According to organizer Jorg Pommeranz, FIFI had to overcome various obstacles, such as China and FIFA applying pressure to exclude Tibet, and difficulties for players representing Northern Cyprus obtaining visas to enter Germany. 

The tournament winners were the Turkish Republic of Northern Cyprus. Spectator attendance was reported as “relatively weak”, with an average of 400 fans per match. Consequently, a second edition of the tournament was deemed to be unlikely.

Participants
 — an autonomous country within the Danish Realm and under the control of the Football Association of Greenland.
 — an unrecognized state under the control of Cyprus Turkish Football Federation.
 — autonomous part of Tanzania but member of CAF.
 — a British Overseas Territory claimed by Spain. Gibraltar gained membership of UEFA in May 2013. The country gained membership of FIFA in May 2016.  
 — an autonomous region of China.
 Republic of St. Pauli — representing the area of St. Pauli of Hamburg, the host city.

Group stage

Group A

Group B

Knockout stage

Semi-finals

Third-place match

Final

See also
Viva World Cup
CONIFA World Football Cup
ELF Cup
Non-FIFA international football

References

 
Non-FIFA football competitions
2005–06 in German football
2006
Gibraltar in international football
Northern Cyprus national football team
Greenland national football team
Sports competitions in Hamburg